Leucaena diversifolia, the wild tamarind or red leucaena, is a species of flowering plant in the family Fabaceae, native to Mexico and Central America. It has been introduced as a cattle fodder in many tropical and subtropical locales around the world. It and its hybrid with Leucaena leucocephala are as aggressively invasive as L.leucocephala itself.

References

diversifolia
Forages
Flora of Northwestern Mexico
Flora of Southwestern Mexico
Flora of Central Mexico
Flora of Veracruz
Flora of Southeastern Mexico
Flora of Guatemala
Flora of El Salvador
Flora of Honduras
Flora of Costa Rica
Plants described in 1842